The 1837 State of the Union Address was given by the eighth president of the United States, Martin Van Buren, on December 5, 1837. It was presented to the 25th United States Congress by a clerk, because it was not yet the custom for the president to deliver it himself. He began with, "We have reason to renew the expression of our devout gratitude to the Giver of All Good for His benign protection. Our country presents on every side the evidences of that continued favor under whose auspices it, has gradually risen from a few feeble and dependent colonies to a prosperous and powerful confederacy."

References

State of the Union addresses
Presidency of Martin Van Buren
25th United States Congress
State of the Union Address
State of the Union Address
State of the Union Address
State of the Union Address
December 1837 events
State of the Union